Sivert August Felde Haugli (born 5 May 1999) is a Norwegian professional footballer who plays as an defender and is a free agent.

Career

Youth & College
Haugli played as part of the youth academy at Snarøya SK, before a spell at Stabæk. In 2016, Haugli joined Bærum and went on to appear for the club's first team in both 2017 and 2018.

In 2018, Haugli moved to the United States to play college soccer at Virginia Tech. In four seasons with the Hokies, Haugli went on to make 71 appearances, scoring four goals and adding three assists. In 2020 he was named to the Academic Honor-Roll.

During his 2021 season at college, Haugli also appeared for USL League Two side Des Moines Menace, scoring two goals in seven regular season games, as well as adding a further goal in two playoff appearances on the way to helping the Menace to the league title.

Professional
On 11 January 2022, Haugli was selected 83rd overall in the 2022 MLS SuperDraft by Portland Timbers. He joined Portland on their preseason tour, but went unsigned by the club.

On 26 April 2022, it was announced Haugli would sign with Portland's MLS Next Pro side Portland Timbers 2, but would spend the remainder of the season with USL Championship club Phoenix Rising. After making nine appearances for Phoenix, he was recalled by Portland on 9 August 2022. He went on to play in six games for Timbers 2 in the MLS Next Pro that season.

Personal
Sivert's father, Frode Haugli, played as a defender for Norwegian side HamKam. His younger brother, Oskar, currently plays at Virginia Tech.

Honours

Club
Des Moines Menace
USL League Two: 2021

References

External links

 

1999 births
Living people
Association football defenders
Bærum SK players
Des Moines Menace players
Expatriate soccer players in the United States
Norwegian expatriate footballers
Norwegian expatriate sportspeople in the United States
Norwegian footballers
Norwegian Second Division players
MLS Next Pro players
Phoenix Rising FC players
Portland Timbers draft picks
Portland Timbers 2 players
USL Championship players
USL League Two players
Virginia Tech Hokies men's soccer players